Much More or Muchmore may refer to:

 Much More (album), a 1990 album by Carola Häggkvist
 "Much More", a number from the 1960 musical The Fantasticks
 "Much More", a song by Whigfield from the 2000 album Whigfield III
 "Much More", a song by De La Soul first released on the 2003 "Shoomp/Much More" single
 MuchMore, a Canadian TV channel later known as M3
 Marie Muchmore (1909–1990), U.S. witness to the assassination of JFK
 Muchmore Valley, a valley in Antarctica
 Robert Muchmore, Australian former professional rugby league footballer

See also
 Much (disambiguation)
 More (disambiguation)